The Shire of West Wimmera is a local government area in the western part of the Wimmera region of Victoria, Australia, located in the western part of the state. It includes the towns of Apsley, Edenhope, Goroke, Gymbowen, Harrow, Kaniva, Minimay, Nurcoung and Serviceton. It was formed in 1995 from the amalgamation of the Shire of Kaniva and parts of the Shire of Kowree, Shire of Arapiles and Shire of Glenelg.

The Shire is governed and administered by the West Wimmera Shire Council; its seat of local government and administrative centre is located at the council headquarters in Edenhope, it also has a service centre located in Kaniva. The Shire is named after the Wimmera region, in which the LGA occupies the western portion. The LGA is also located entirely to the west of the Wimmera River, which actually meanders through another municipality to the east, that is the Rural City of Horsham.

Council

Current composition
The council is composed of five councillors elected to represent an unsubdivided municipality. Council Composition as of November 2022.

Administration and governance
The council meets in the council chambers in the Edenhope and Kaniva Municipal Offices. It also provides customer services at both centres.

Controversies
In April 2022, Mayor Bruce Meyer caused outrage by likening requests to display the internationally recognised LGBTIQ+ pride flag to mark the International Day Against Homophobia, Biphobia, Intersexism and Transphobia (IDAHOBIT)  to the promotion of pedophilia.

Townships and localities
The 2021 census, the shire had a population of 4,006 up from 3,903 in the 2016 census

^ - Territory divided with another LGA
* - Not noted in 2016 Census
# - Not noted in 2021 Census

See also
 List of places on the Victorian Heritage Register in the Shire of West Wimmera

References

External links

West Wimmera Shire Council official website
Metlink local public transport map 
Link to Land Victoria interactive maps

Local government areas of Victoria (Australia)
Grampians (region)